The 1898 Harvard Crimson football team was an American football team that represented Harvard University as an independent during the 1898 college football season. In their second year under head coach William Cameron Forbes, the Crimson compiled an 11–0 record, shut out seven of eleven opponents, and outscored all opponents by a total of 257 to 19.

There was no contemporaneous system in 1898 for determining a national champion. However, Harvard was retroactively named as the national champion by the Billingsley Report, Helms Athletic Foundation, Houlgate System, and National Championship Foundation. Princeton, which finished the 1898 season 11–0–1, was named champion by one selector, Parke H. Davis.

Three Harvard players were consensus first-team selections on the 1898 All-American football team: quarterback Charles Dudley Daly; halfback Benjamin Dibblee; and end John Hallowell. Other notable players included fullback Bill Reid; tackles Percy Haughton and Malcolm Donald; guard Walter Boal; halfback Leicester Warren; center Percy Malcolm Jaffrey; and end Francis Douglas Cochran. Haughton and Daly were later inducted into the College Football Hall of Fame.

Schedule

References

Harvard
Harvard Crimson football seasons
College football national champions
College football undefeated seasons
Harvard Crimson football